Glaphyrina plicata is a species of large sea snail, a marine gastropod mollusc in the family Fasciolariidae.

Distribution
This species is endemic to the northern part of the North Island of New Zealand. It is found in waters of about 80 m.

The shell height is up to 44.5 mm, and width up to 19.5 mm.

References

 Powell A W B, New Zealand Mollusca, William Collins Publishers Ltd, Auckland, New Zealand 1979 
 Powell A.W.B. (1929) The Recent and Tertiary species of the genus Buccinulum in New Zealand, with a review of related genera and families. Transactions of the New Zealand Institute 60: 57-101, pls 1-4. [Published 31 May 1929]
page(s): 97
 Beu, A.G. (1965) Lower Pleistocene Mollusca from Devil's Elbow, Hawke's Bay. Transactions of the Royal Society of New Zealand, Geology, 3, 139–149.
 Spencer, H.G., Marshall, B.A. & Willan, R.C. (2009). Checklist of New Zealand living Mollusca. Pp 196-219. in: Gordon, D.P. (ed.) New Zealand inventory of biodiversity. Volume one. Kingdom Animalia: Radiata, Lophotrochozoa, Deuterostomia. Canterbury University Press, Christchurch.
 Maxwell, P.A. (2009). Cenozoic Mollusca. Pp 232-254 in Gordon, D.P. (ed.) New Zealand inventory of biodiversity. Volume one. Kingdom Animalia: Radiata, Lophotrochozoa, Deuterostomia. Canterbury University Press, Christchurch.

Fasciolariidae
Gastropods of New Zealand
Gastropods described in 1929